Ancilla ordinaria, the white-banded ancilla,  is a species of sea snail, a marine gastropod mollusk in the family Ancillariidae.

Description
The shell size varies between 8 mm and 21 mm

Distribution
This marine species is distributed in the Indian Ocean along South Africa and Mozambique

References

 Reeve L.A. (1864). The genus Ancillaria. Conch. Icon., vol. 15 page(s): Plate 9, fig. 44

External links
 

ordinaria
Gastropods described in 1906